Arca mailleana is an extinct species of saltwater clam, a fossil marine bivalve mollusk in the family Arcidae, the ark shells. This species was described by Alcide d'Orbigny in 1843.

References

Bibliography 
 

Arcidae
Prehistoric bivalves
Fossil taxa described in 1843